= Oliver Black (film) =

2020 Moroccan drama film

- Directed by: Tawfik Baba
- Written by: Tawfik Baba
- Produced by: Rabab Aboulhassani
- Starring: Modu Mbow; Mohamed Elachi; Ilham Oujri; Hassan Richiou
- Cinematography: Smail Touil
- Edited by: Yassin Jaber; Aissam Raja
- Music by: Zakaria Nouih
- Production company: 7th Sense
- Distributed by: Cinémoi (USA TV)
- Release date: 17 December 2020; (Morocco)
- Running time: 93 minutes
- Country: Morocco
- Language: French
- Budget: $29,500 (estd.)

Oliver Black is a 2020 Moroccan drama film directed by Tawfik Baba and co-produced by Rabab Aboulhassani and Tawfik Baba. The film stars Modu Mbow in lead roles whereas Mohamed Elachi, Ilham Oujri and Hassan Richiou star in supportive roles. The film revolves around Vendredi, a young African boy who became a member of ISIS who initially thought to enter the art of circus when crosses the desert to reach Morocco.

The film received critics acclaim and screened worldwide. The film was also nominated for the Golden Globe Awards.

== Cast ==
- Modu Mbow as Vendredi (Friday)
- Mohamed Elachi as Soldier
- Ilham Oujri as White Man's Grand Daughter
- Hassan Richiou as White Man
